= Hawks Nest Golf Club =

Golf course in New South Wales, Australia

Coordinates: 32°39′56″S 152°10′56″E

Club information
- Established: 1963
- Total holes: 18
- Website: https://www.hawksnestgolfclub.com.au

Hawks Nest Golf Club is a championship rated 18-hole golf course with an Australian Course Rating of 72 in the Hunter Region of New South Wales, Australia.
